The Communauté d'agglomération Amiens Métropole is a communauté d'agglomération in the Somme département and in the  Hauts-de-France région of France. It was created in December 1999. Its area is 348.7 km2. Its population was 180,905 in 2018, of which 133,891 in Amiens proper.

History 
In 1991 a study was started by SIEPA (Syndicat Intercommunal d'Etude et de Amiénois Programming), which was the origin of Greater Amiens, established in 1994 with 18 municipalities.

Pursuant to the Chevènement Act, 2000, it was turned into a communauté d'agglomération, Amiens Métropole, which then encompassed 20 communes with the arrival of Allonville and Bertangles.

Since then, Amiens Métropole has continued to add more communes: 2003, with 21 municipalities, 2004 with 27 municipalities, and in 2007, 33 municipalities. In January 2018, it was expanded with 6 more communes from the Communauté de communes du Territoire Nord Picardie and the Communauté de communes Nièvre et Somme to 39 communes.

Composition 
The communauté d'agglomération consists of the following 39 communes:

Allonville
Amiens
Bertangles
Blangy-Tronville
Bovelles
Boves
Cagny
Camon
Cardonnette
Clairy-Saulchoix
Creuse
Dreuil-lès-Amiens
Dury
Estrées-sur-Noye
Ferrières
Glisy
Grattepanche
Guignemicourt
Hébécourt
Longueau
Pissy
Pont-de-Metz
Poulainville
Querrieu
Remiencourt
Revelles
Rivery
Rumigny
Sains-en-Amiénois
Saint-Fuscien
Saint-Sauflieu
Saint-Vaast-en-Chaussée
Saleux
Salouël
Saveuse
Seux
Thézy-Glimont
Vaux-en-Amiénois
Vers-sur-Selle

Responsibilities 
 Action for Economic Development (Support for industrial, commercial or employment, support agricultural and forestry activities)  
 Action to promote housing for the disadvantaged 
 Advocacy 
 Sanitation 
 Waste Collection and household treatment 
 Construction and development, maintenance and management of equipment or cultural institutions, socio-cultural, socio-educational, sports 
 Design, development and maintenance of the roads 
 Design, development, maintenance and management of business areas (industrial, commercial, service, craft or tourist) 
 Design, development, maintenance and management of port or airport activities 
 Crematorium 
 Contractual urban development, community development and economic and social integration 
 Local crime prevention 
 Water (treatment, supply, distribution) 
 Research and Programming 
 Noise control 
 IT networking (Internet, cable)  
 Operation scheduled for improving habitat (OPAH) 
 Urban Transport Organization 
 Housing policy
 Agenda local housing 
 Protection and enhancement of the environment 
 Air Quality 
 Tourism
 Waste processing

Tax and budget 
The community is financed by the single business tax (15.27% 2006), which replaces the taxes once payable by the member communes.

See also 
Communes of the Somme department

References

Agglomeration communities in France
Intercommunalities of Somme (department)